Francis William Harding Davies (born 22 November 1946) is a British-born Canadian record producer, music publisher, and founder of the Canadian Songwriters Hall of Fame (Panthéon des Auteurs et Compositeurs Canadiens). Davies has been a major contributor to the growth of Canada’s music industry and its creative community for more than four decades. He is credited with discovering, producing, publishing, and developing the careers of many celebrated artists and songwriters, as well as being an advocate for their status.

Davies received the Juno Awards 2014 Walt Grealis Special Achievement Award, recognizing individuals who have made a significant impact on the Canadian music industry.

Family and early life
Born in Northampton, England, the son of British politician John Davies, by his marriage to Vera Georgina Harding-Davies, the young Davies was educated at Windlesham House School near Brighton, Pangbourne College, and Strasbourg University, in north-east France. On 1 June 1972 he married the Canadian pop singer Lynda Squires, daughter of Ruth Mullen Squires. The marriage produced three children, Meghan Mae Harding Davies, now Ehrensperger, Emily Gwyneth Emerson Davies-Cohen, and Kate Theresa Georgina Davies.

Career as record producer and publisher
Davies started his music career in 1964 as a French correspondent to Billboard. He later worked for both EMI Records and Liberty Records in London until the late 1960s, before migrating to Canada in 1970. There, he co-founded the independent record label Daffodil (named after the national emblem of Wales and as a symbol of hope and new beginnings), which became the first Canadian label to be distributed by a ‘major’ in that country, in the shape of Capitol/EMI. Davies signed Tom Cochrane, Crowbar, A Foot In Coldwater, the King Biscuit Boy, Klaatu and others to his label throughout the 70’s and published their songs. As a record producer, among other hits he produced for the label, was the first CanCon single ever released - "Oh What A Feeling" (Crowbar), as well as A Foot In Coldwater’s classic rock hit "(Make Me Do) Anything You Want".

In 1978 alongside Daffodil he formed Partisan Music a production and publishing company that entered into an exclusive deal with a U.S record company (Capitol) to develop talent for that label worldwide – a Canadian first. He brought artists including Alfie Zappacosta, Graham Shaw, and the Leggat Brothers to Capitol Records.

In early 1982 Davies put his label and production company on hold to become President of ATV Music Canada. At ATV, he developed the songwriting careers, of Eddie Schwartz, David Tyson, Aldo Nova, the Pukka Orchestra, Headpins, Chilliwack and Toronto, and became a full-time music publisher.

In 1986, as a result of ATV’s purchase by Michael Jackson, Davies formed The Music Publisher (TMP) and built it into Canada’s largest and most successful independent music publisher over the next 14 years.  Frank sold TMP to Alliance Communications Corporation and A&F Music in 1994 staying on as its President/CEO until the end of 1999 at which time he founded the music consultancy firm he currently operates - Let Me Be Frank Inc.

TMP secured over 1,500 cover recordings, of the 5,000 Canadian songs Davies published, by artists as diverse as Joe Cocker, Bonnie Raitt, Alice Cooper, The Doobie Brothers, Tom Cochrane, Heart, Cher, Don Henley & Sheryl Crow, kd lang, Tanya Tucker, Alannah Myles, Loverboy, Terri Clark, Emmylou Harris, Wynonna, George Jones, Bette Midler, The Carpenters, Blue Öyster Cult, Amanda Marshall, The Pukka Orchestra and The Guess Who.

During the TMP years Davies signed and published the songs of songwriters and artists including Jane Siberry, Murray McLauchlan, Honeymoon Suite, Ron Hynes, Eddie Schwartz, Hagood Hardy, Dean McTaggart, Sherry Kean, Exchange, Ian Thomas/Boomers, Gil Grand, and John Capek; as well as American songwriters Byron Hill, Rick Braun, and Odie Blackmon. TMP opened a Nashville office in the mid-90s.

Since founding Let Me Be Frank Inc, Davies has been the executive producer for albums by Serena Ryder, who he brought to EMI Music, The Rankin Family, The Treasures whose debut was released by Universal in the spring, and he is currently working on the solo debut for Heather Rankin, the youngest member of the famed Cape Breton family. LMBF also publishes the works of longtime client and record producer David Tyson, is a consultant to corporate client Ole Media Management, and has consulted to Microsoft/Xbox, as well as the Department of Canadian Heritage, the Neighbouring Rights Collective of Canada, and to a variety of songwriters, artists and music publishers with respect to the sale and acquisition of their copyright catalogues. 

Davies has served as a director on industry boards including CARAS (Vice President/Trustee), CMRRA (Chair), FACTOR, PROCAN, Canadian Music Publishers Association (CMPA), OMDC, SOCAN and the Socan Foundation (Chair).

Canadian Songwriters Hall of Fame
In 1998 he founded the non-profit Canadian Songwriters Hall of Fame/Le panthéon des auteurs et compositeurs Canadiens (CSHF/PACC) serving as its Chairman until 2004. The Canadian Songwriters Hall of Fame has inducted Canadian songwriters such as Gordon Lightfoot, Leonard Cohen, RUSH, Robbie Robertson, Joni Mitchell and Oscar Peterson.

Boards Served in Canada
CHAIRMAN - Canadian Songwriters Hall of Fame (CSHF) 2000-2004
Ontario Media Development Corporation (OMDC) 2001-02
FOUNDING MEMBER - Canadian Independent Record Production Association (CIRPA) 1970
VICE-PRESIDENT & TRUSTEE -  Canadian Academy of Recording Arts & Sciences (CARAS) 1983-90
CHAIRMAN -  The SOCAN Foundation 1990-97
Foundation to Assist Canadian Talent on Record (FACTOR) 1985-88
Society of Composers, Authors & Music Publishers (SOCAN) 1990-99
Performing Rights Organization of Canada (PROCAN) 1983-89
Music Promotion Foundation (MPF) 1985-90
EXECUTIVE COMMITTEE - Canadian Music Publishers Association (CMPA) 1982-2000
CHAIRMAN - Canadian Musical Reproduction Rights Agency (CMRRA) 1982-2000

Awards
Canadian Songwriters Hall of Fame (CSHF) Special Achievement Award (2005)
SOCAN Society of Composers, Authors & Music Publishers of Canada Special Achievement Award (2004)
CARAS Canadian Academy of Recording Arts and Sciences Dedicated Service Award (1993)
Juno Award Dedicated Service Award (1990)
MARQUEE MAGAZINE FRANK DAVIES named one of the "Top 30: Canadian Music's Power Brokers"
PROCAN AWARD Dedicated Service Award (1990)
THE RECORD 'Music Publisher of the Year' (1990)
THE RECORD 'Music Publisher of the Year' (1989)
RECORD WORLD MAGAZINE (US) Gold Label Award (1977)

References

Bibliography
Hon. Francis William Harding Davies in Canadian Who's Who, Vol. XLI (University of Toronto Press, 2006)

External links
Official website

1946 births
20th-century Canadian businesspeople
21st-century Canadian businesspeople
Canadian record producers
English emigrants to Canada
English expatriates in France
Living people
People educated at Pangbourne College
People educated at Windlesham House School
University of Strasbourg alumni